John Earle (15 November 1865 – 6 February 1932), commonly referred to as Jack Earle, was an Australian politician who served as Premier of Tasmania from 1914 to 1916 and also for one week in October 1909. He later served as a Senator for Tasmania from 1917 to 1923. Prior to entering politics, he worked as a miner and prospector. He began his career in the Australian Labor Party (ALP), helping to establish a local branch of the party, and was Tasmania's first ALP premier. However, he was expelled from the party during the 1916 split and joined the Nationalists, whom he represented in the Senate.

Early life 
Earle was born on 15 November 1865 in Bridgewater, Tasmania, the son of Ann Teresa (née McShane) and Charles Staples Earle. His mother and father were of Irish and Cornish descent respectively. Earle grew up on his father's farm and attended the local state school. At the age of 14 he was apprenticed as a blacksmith at a foundry in Hobart. He attended engineering and science classes at the Hobart Technical School and also attended lectures at the Hobart Mechanics' Institute, as a result of which he developed an interest in politics. He was a member of the Hobart Debating Club and became acquainted with the colony's attorney-general Andrew Inglis Clark.

After completing his apprenticeship, Earle worked on the mines at Mathinna, Zeehan and Corinna. In 1893 he was a miners' representative at a government conference in Hobart. He returned to Zeehan in 1898 and became prominent in the local community, serving on the Zeehan Municipal Council, on the local hospital board, and as president of the Gormanston branch of the Amalgamated Miners' Association. He was one of 28 men blacklisted by the manager of the Mount Lyell Mining and Railway Company for being "disloyal and treacherous".

In 1901, Earle chaired the conference which established the Workers' Political League (WPL), the predecessor of the modern Australian Labor Party (Tasmanian Branch). He was elected as the organisation's inaugural president in 1903.

Political career

State politics
Earle was defeated by three votes in the Tasmanian House of Assembly seat of Waratah at the 1903 state election. He reprised his candidacy in 1906 and was successful, subsequently being elected as leader of the parliamentary party. Following electoral reform, Earle was elected to the multi-member seat of Franklin at the 1909 election. He served Leader of the Opposition until 20 October 1909, when he formed a minority government of one week. He was the first premier of Tasmania from the ALP.

In 1914, Earle and the ALP formed another minority government after the defeat of Albert Solomon's government on a confidence motion. In addition to the premiership he also appointed himself attorney-general. In the House of Assembly the government relied on the vote of independent MP Joshua Whitsitt, and in the unreformed Legislative Council it had few supporters. Its accomplishments including the extension of public secondary education, the nationalisation of the Waddamana hydroelectricity scheme, and the establishment of the state's first national parks, Mount Field and Freycinet. Earle authorised large quantities of wheat to be imported in 1914 to alleviate a drought and "made large investments in public works to alleviate war-caused unemployment". During the early years of World War I he encouraged the unemployed to enlist in the military.

After the ALP was defeated at the 1916 election, Earle returned to his prior position as Leader of the Opposition. He viewed the aim of the ALP as "true progressive liberalism" rather than socialism, and some of his policy positions had alienated more radical members of the party, notably his support for overseas conscription. In November 1916, during the nationwide party split over conscription, he announced his resignation from the ALP in an open letter, stating that "the movement has been corrupted by bodies of extremists, irresponsible and in some cases distinctly disloyal men, aided and abetted by the weakness, cowardice, and treachery of the officers of the organisation and members of the Parliamentary party obtaining control of the movement". He resignation was widely regarded as pre-empted his expulsion.

Federal politics
In March 1917 Earle, who had by then joined the Nationalist Party of Australia, was elected by the Parliament of Tasmania to fill a vacancy in the Australian Senate.  He retained his seat in the 1917 election. He became Vice-President of the Executive Council in the Hughes ministry from December 1921 to February 1923. He was defeated at the Senate election held in December 1922, and again in 1925, as a Nationalist candidate. In 1928 he stood as an independent candidate in Franklin, but was unsuccessful.

Death 
Earle died at Kettering, Tasmania, on 6 February 1932. He left a widow but no children. His cousin, Alicia O'Shea Petersen, would later follow Earle into politics as a prominent suffragist.

Legacy
In 2009 Labor Prime Minister Kevin Rudd briefly noted the centenary of Earle forming Tasmania's first Labor government.

References 

 

|-

|-

1865 births
1932 deaths
Premiers of Tasmania
Australian Labor Party members of the Parliament of Tasmania
Australian people of Cornish descent
Nationalist Party of Australia members of the Parliament of Australia
Members of the Australian Senate for Tasmania
Members of the Australian Senate
Members of the Cabinet of Australia
Leaders of the Opposition in Tasmania
20th-century Australian politicians
People from Zeehan